The King's Speech is a 2010 British historical drama film directed by Tom Hooper, from a script by David Seidler. The film stars Colin Firth as George (both Duke of York and later king), Helena Bonham Carter as his wife Queen Elizabeth, and Geoffrey Rush as the speech therapist Lionel Logue. The film focuses on the attempts by George to overcome his stutter, a process in which Logue was instrumental.

The King's Speech premiered on 6 September 2010 at the Telluride Film Festival in the United States, and was screened at the 2010 Toronto International Film Festival on 10 September 2010, where it received a standing ovation and won the People's Choice Award. It was eventually released in the UK on 7 January 2011. The film grossed a worldwide total at the box office of over $414 million on a production budget of £8 million ($15 million). After five weeks on UK release, it was identified as the most successful independent British film ever. It appeared in the Top Ten lists of more than twenty reviewers for the best films of 2010.

At the 83rd Academy Awards, the film received a total of twelve award nominations, more than any other film, and won four: Best Picture, Best Director (Hooper), Best Original Screenplay (Seidler), and Best Actor (Firth). At the 68th Golden Globe Awards, the film received seven nominations, more than any other nominee, but only Firth won an award, for Best Actor. Hooper also won for Best Director at the 63rd Directors Guild of America Awards. At the 17th Screen Actors Guild Awards, Firth won the Best Actor award and the cast won Best Ensemble. At the 64th British Academy Film Awards, it won seven awards out of fourteen nominations, more than any other film, consisting of Best Film, Outstanding British Film, Best Actor (Firth), Best Supporting Actor (Rush), Best Supporting Actress (Bonham Carter), Best Original Screenplay (Seidler), and Best Music (Alexandre Desplat).

Accolades

See also
2010 in film

References

External links
 

Lists of accolades by film

vi:The King's Speech#Đề cử và giải thưởng